Fouha Point, also known as Fouha Rock or Creation Point,  is a National Natural Landmark on the United States territory of  Guam. The point was designated a National Natural Landmark in 1972. According to Chamorro legend, the rock is the resting place of the goddess Fu’una who, with her brother Puntan, created the world.

References

Headlands of Guam
National Natural Landmarks in Guam
Umatac, Guam